Carmelo Ríos may refer to:
 Carmelo Ríos (athlete) (1959–2022), long-distance runner from Puerto Rico
 Carmelo Ríos Santiago (born 1973), member of the Senate of Puerto Rico